This is a complete list of authors published as UK first editions by Collins Crime Club which ran from 1930 to 1994.

 Anthony Abbot (pen name of Fulton Oursler)
 Paul Adam
 Herbert Adams
 Catherine Aird
 Cyril Alington
 Stella Allan
 Margery Allingham
 Lindsay Anson
 David Anthony
 Michael David Anthony
 Catherine Arley
 Charlotte Armstrong
 David Armstrong
 Vivien Armstrong
 Jeffrey Ashford
 Alex Auswaks
 Marian Babson
 Edith-Jane Bahr
 Edwin Balmer
 Robert Barnard
 Nina Bawden
 George Baxt
 Ken Begg
 Kenneth Benton
 Maisie Birmingham
 Gavin Black  (pseudonym of Oswald Wynd)
 Lionel Black
 Nicholas Blake
 Lawrence G. Blochman
 Martin Booth
 Ruth Brandon
 Lilian Jackson Braun
 Mary Bringle
 Lynn Brock
 Gordon Bromley
 Pat Burden
 Eric Burgess
 Miles Burton (see John Rhode)
 Roger Busby
 Gwendoline Butler
 Michael Butterworth (also published one book in the Crime Club series under the name Sarah Kemp)
 Alison Cairns
 Taylor Caldwell
 Alice Campbell
 Harriette Campbell
 Harry Carmichael (see Hartley Howard)
 Carol Carnac (see E.C.R. Lorac)
 Sarah Caudwell
 Nellise Child
 Agatha Christie
 Anna Clarke
 Carol Clemeau
 Liza Cody
 G. D. H. Cole and Margaret Cole
 Norman Collins
 Barry Cork
 Mary Craig
 Freeman Wills Crofts
 Maurice Culpan
 Clare Curzon
 George Davis
 S.F.X. Dean
 Anthony Dekker
 David Delman
 Michael Delving
 Dominic Devine
 Eileen Dewhurst
 Roy Doliner
 Sergio Donati
 Patricia Donnelly
 Theodora Du Bois
 Roger East
 Mignon G. Eberhart
 Marjorie Eccles
 A.C. & Carmen Edington
 Janet Edmonds
 Aaron J. Elkins
 Charlotte Epstein
 Francis Everton
 J. Jefferson Farjeon
 Stewart Farrar
 Katherine Farrer
 John Ferguson
 Elizabeth Ferrars
 A Fielding
 Nigel Fitzgerald
 Anne Fleming
 Joan Fleming
 J. S. Fletcher
 Pat Flower
 Hulbert Footner
 Florence Ford
 Leslie Ford
 Malcolm Forsythe
 Anthea Fraser
 Timothy Fuller
 Maurice Gagnon
 Malcolm Gair
 Andrew Garve
 Jonathan Gash  (also published one book in the Crime Club series under the name Graham Gaunt)
 James Gibbins
 Val Gielgud
 Anthony Gilbert
 Josephine Gill
 Robert Goldsborough
 C.L. Grace (pseudonym of P. C. Doherty)
 J.M. Gregson
 Francis D. Grierson
 Margaret Haffner
 Patricia Hall
 Bruce Hamilton
 Ian Hamilton
 Jeanne Hart
 Steve Haywood
 Keith Heller
 James Henderson
 Reginald Hill
 John Buxton Hilton
 Margaret Hinxman
 Henry Holt
 Hartley Howard
 Helen Hull
 Richard Hull
 Peter Inchbald
 Anne Infante
 Jacquemard-Senecal
 Terry James
 Charlotte Jay
 Simon Jay
 Roderic Jeffries
 Cecil Jenkins
 Selwyn Jepson
 Hamilton Jobson
 Sheila Johnson
 Hazel Wynn Jones
 Lucille Kallen
 Frances Kazan
 H.R.F. Keating
 David Keith
 Faye Kellerman
 Nora Kelly
 Sarah Kemp (see Michael Butterworth)
 Michael Kenyon
 C. Daly King
 Pauline King
 Frank Kippax
 Auguste Le Breton
 Roy Lewis
 Conyth Little
 Vernon Loder
 E.C.R. Lorac
 Philip Loraine
 Ona Low
 Francis Lyall
 Thomas McCann
 Philip MacDonald
 Ross Macdonald
 Donald Mackenzie
 Allan MacKinnon
 Charlotte MacLeod 
 John Malcolm
 Jessica Mann
 Paul Mansfield
 Maxwell March (pseudonym of Margery Allingham)
 Irving Marder
 Virgil Markham
 Ngaio Marsh
 James Martin
 Sarah J. Mason
 Jean Matheson
 Lew Matthews
 Nancy Barr Mavity
 Pat McGerr
 Margaret McKinlay
 Donald McLarty
 Thomas Patrick McMahon
 Mary McMullen
 M.R.D. Meek
 Brown Meggs
 Lawrence Meyer
 Laurence Meynell
 George Milner
 Margaret Moore
 Susan Morrow
 Patricia Moyes
 Haughton Murphy
 Stephen Murray
 Magdalen Nabb
 Robert Nicholas
 Torben Nielsen
 A.J. Orde
 Emma Page
 Stuart Palmer
 Roger Parkes
 Barbara Paul
 Michael Pearce
 John Penn
 Rupert Penny
 Michael Pereira
 Ritchie Perry
 Ellis Peters
 Bernard Peterson
 R. Philmore
 Nancy Pickard
 Martin Porlock (see Philip MacDonald)
 Raymond Postgate
 Lester Powell
 Andrew Puckett
 Diana Ramsay
 Clayton Rawson
 Lawrie Reznek
 John Rhode
 Mike Ripley
 Mary Linn Roby
 Ralph Rodd
 A.J. Russell
 Martin Russell
 Douglas Rutherford
 Francis Ryck
 Walter Satterthwait
 Gavin Scott
 Jack Scott
 Kate Sedley
 Mabel Seeley
 David Serafin
 Robyn Sheffield
 Evelyn E. Smith
 Shelley Smith
 Willard K. Smith
 Paul Somers
 Pat Stadley
 Douglas Stewart
 Zachary Stone (pseudonym of Ken Follett)
 Rex Stout
 John Stephen Strange
 L.A.G. Strong
 Julian Symons
 William G. Tapply
 Phoebe Atwood Taylor
 Joseph Telushkin
 Rosie Thomas
 Alice Tilton (see Phoebe Atwood Taylor)
 Robert Tine
 Simon Troy
 Peter Turnbull
 J.V. Turner
 Jonathan Valin
 John Wainwright
 H. Russell Wakefield
 Edgar Wallace
 J.M. Walsh
 Colin Ward
 John Welcome
 Charles West
 Ethel Lina White
 R.J. White
 Victor Whitechurch
 David Williams
 Pauline Glen Winslow
 Sarah Wolf
 Ted Wood
 Sara Woods
 Eric Wright
 L.R. Wright
 Philip Wylie
 Shelby Yastrow

References

Book clubs
Lists of writers
Collins Crime Club